Ye Gulistan Hamara is a 1973 Indian Hindi-language drama film directed by Atmaram. It stars Dev Anand, Sharmila Tagore, Pran, Sujit Kumar, Johnny Walker in pivotal roles, with music by S. D. Burman. Dialogue and screenplay are by Wajahat Mirza. The films depicts a tribal community living on the border with China; the song "Mera Naam Aao" was considered particularly offensive to the Ao Naga community in Nagaland.

Plot 
India is worried about its north eastern residents who are cut off from the mainland and are generally backward, illiterate and under developed. The government appoints special officer-cum-civil engineer Vijay to construct a bridge over a river next to the tribal village of Ding in the north eastern part of India. Ding is ruled by the cruel and autocratic Deng Do Rani and his henchmen Haku, Teju and trusted fighter Soo Reni. Deng Do Rani wants to sabotage the construction and sends Soo Reni and other warriors to demolish the bridge. They are captured by Vijay's officers and treated with respect and equality. Deng Do Rani sends others to kill the band captured, and the Indian Officers under the leadership of Vijay fight bravely to protect them. Soo Reni and her companions have a change of heart and pledge to support Vijay in his mission. Vijay and Soo Reni also fall in love with each other.

Cast 
 Dev Anand as Vijay
 Sharmila Tagore as Soo Reni
 Pran as Deng Do Rani
 Sujit Kumar as Teju
 Johnny Walker as Tuna's Boyfriend
 Jayshree T. as Tuna
 Kanan Kaushal as Mrs. Barua
 Lalita Pawar as Soo Reni's Mother
 Ramesh Deo as Inspector Barua
 Raj Mehra as Pal
 Sapru as Salvatore
 Keshto Mukherjee as Soldier
 G. Asrani as Asrani
 Jankidas as Haku
 Iftekhar as Vijay's Captain

Music 

 In the song "Kya Yeh Zindagi Hai", S. D. Burman has given the vocal for the line "Ek Baar Mila De Na" randomly. 
 In the song "Raina Soyi Soyi", both S. D. Burman and R. D. Burman have given small vocal parts.

Production 
Some scenes of the film were shot in Arunachal Pradesh.

References

External links 
 

1972 films
1970s Hindi-language films
1972 drama films
Films shot in Arunachal Pradesh
Films scored by S. D. Burman